A Certain Smile is a novel written by Françoise Sagan.

A Certain Smile may also refer to:

A Certain Smile (film), an adaptation of the novel starring Rossano Brazzi and Joan Fontaine
"A Certain Smile" (song), written for the film and sung by Johnny Mathis